Deadrin Senat (born July 22, 1994) is an American football nose tackle for the Tampa Bay Buccaneers of the National Football League (NFL). He played college football at South Florida, and was drafted by the Atlanta Falcons in the third round of the 2018 NFL Draft.

College career
Initially Senat committed to Florida State early, but later decommitted early so that he could explore his options.  After his senior year, Senat was named to the All-AAC First-team.  Senat was also invited to the 2018 East-West Shrine game, along with teammates Quinton Flowers and D'Ernest Johnson.  This was the first year 3 players from the Bulls were invited to the East-West Shrine game.

Professional career
On November 30, 2017, it was reported that Senat had accepted his invitation to play in the 2018 East-West Shrine Game. Senat impressed scouts during East-West Shrine Game practices and improved his draft stock. Senat sustained a minor knee strain during practice and was unable to play in the East-West Shrine Game. He also received an invitation to play in the 2018 Senior Bowl, but declined due to his injury. Senat attended the NFL Scouting Combine and completed all of the combine and positional drills.

On March 26, 2018, Senat participated at South Florida's pro day but opted to stand on his combine numbers and only performed positional drills. At the conclusion of the pre-draft process, Senat was projected to be a third-round pick by NFL draft experts and scouts. He was ranked as the eighth-best defensive tackle prospect in the draft by DraftScout.com and was ranked the ninth-best defensive tackle by Scouts Inc.

Atlanta Falcons
The Atlanta Falcons selected Senat in the third round (90th overall) of the 2018 NFL Draft. Senat was the ninth defensive tackle drafted in 2018.

On May 10, 2018, the Falcons signed Senat to a four-year, $3.42 million contract that includes a signing bonus of $817,960.

On August 8, 2021, Senat was waived/injured and placed on injured reserve. He was released on November 8, 2021.

Tampa Bay Buccaneers
On April 21, 2022, Senat signed with the Tampa Bay Buccaneers. He was waived on August 30, 2022 and signed to the practice squad the next day. He was promoted to the active roster on September 21.

References

External links
Atlanta Falcons bio
South Florida Bulls bio

1994 births
Living people
American football defensive tackles
Atlanta Falcons players
People from Immokalee, Florida
Players of American football from Florida
South Florida Bulls football players
Tampa Bay Buccaneers